Maffei is a surname of Italian origin.

Surname

Alberto Maffei (born 1995), Italian snowboarder
Alessandro, Marquis de Maffei (1662–1730), Bavarian general
Agnese Maffeis (born 1965), Italian discus thrower and shot putter
Andrea Maffei (1798–1885), Italian poet and librettist
Andrea Maffei (architect) (born 1968), Italian architect
Angela Maffeis (born 1996), Italian cyclist
Antonio Maffei (died 1482), Italian bishop
Antonio Maffei da Volterra (1450–1478), Italian clergyman and member of the Pazzi Conspiracy
Arturo Maffei (1909–2006), Italian long jumper and footballer
Ascanio Maffei (died 1659), Italian bishop
Blanca Renée Arrillaga Oronoz de Maffei (1917–2011), Uruguayan chemist, botanist, and agrostologist
Bernardino Maffei (1514–1553), Italian archbishop and cardinal
Cecilia Maffei (born 1984), Italian speed skater
Cesare Maffei (1805–???), Italian painter
Clara Maffei (1814–1886), Italian socialite and salon hostess
Claire Mafféi (1919–2004), French actress
Claudio Maffei (born 1999), Italian footballer
Damian Maffei (born 1977), American actor
Dan Maffei (born 1968), American politician
Francesco Maffei (1605–1660), Italian painter
Francesco Scipione, marchese di Maffei (1675–1755), Venetian archaeologist and author
Giovanni Pietro Maffei (1533–1603), Italian Jesuit and writer
Giovanni Camillo Maffei (fl. 1562-1573), Neapolitan physician and music theorist
Giuliano Maffei (died 1510), Italian bishop
Giuseppe Maffei (born 1974), Italian runner
Greg Maffei (born 1960), American businessman
Ivan Maffeis (born 1963), Italian journalist and bishop
Ivano Maffei (born 1958), Italian cyclist
Joseph Anton von Maffei (1790–1870), German industrialist
Leonard Maffei (died 1989), Italian-American cyclist
Marcantonio Maffei (1521–1583), Italian bishop and cardinal
Michele Maffei (born 1946), Italian fencer
Orazio Maffei (1580–1609), Italian cardinal
Paolo Maffei (1926–2009), Italian astrophysicist
Paolo Alessandro Maffei (1653—1716), Italian antiquarian and humanist
Raffaello Maffei (1451–1522), Italian humanist, historian and theologian

See also

Places
Istituto Maffei, school in Verona, Italy
Palace of Maffei Marescotti, ancient palace in Rome, Italy
Palazzo Maffei, historic palace in Verona, Italy

Companies
Maffei (company), German locomotives manufacturer
KraussMaffei, German manufacturer
Krauss-Maffei Wegmann, German arms manufacturer

Astrology
Maffei Group, group of galaxies
Maffei 1, massive elliptical galaxy in the constellation Cassiopeia
Maffei 2, intermediate spiral galaxy in the constellation Cassiopeia

Surnames
Surnames of Italian origin